AMI or Ami may refer to:

Arts, entertainment and media 
AMI-tv, a Canadian TV channel
AMI-télé, the French-language version
AMI-audio, a Canadian audio broadcast TV service
Ami Magazine, an Orthodox Jewish news magazine

Businesses and organizations 
 AMI Insurance, in New Zealand
 AMI Semiconductor, acquired by Onsemi
 Accessible Media Inc., a Canadian media company for the visually impaired
 African Minerals Limited (AMI.L)
 Alternative Miss Ireland, a Dublin beauty pageant
 Amazon Malaria Initiative
 American Meat Institute, a trade association 
 American Media, Inc., now A360media, a publisher
 American Megatrends Inc., a computer company
 American Monetary Institute, a non-profit
 American Mustache Institute, an advocacy organization 
 Anugerah Musik Indonesia, an annual Indonesian music award ceremony
 Armes-Militaria-Informations, a Belgian magazine, later Fire
 Associació de Municipis per la Independència (Association of Municipalities for Independence), in Catalonia
 Association Montessori Internationale, a non-governmental organization
 Association of Medical Illustrators, an international organization for certification in medical illustration
 Australian Marketing Institute, a professional body
 Australian Motor Industries, a former automobile assembly firm

People, ethnic groups and language 
Ami (given name), including a list of people and fictional characters with that name
Ami people, an indigenous people of Taiwan
 Ami or Amis language
Ami language (Australia), a Marranj language

Places 
Ami, Ibaraki, Japan
Selaparang Airport, a defunct airport in Lombok, Indonesia, IATA code AMI
AMI Stadium (disambiguation), several uses

Science, technology and mathematics 
 Amí, a word processing program 
 Ami (camera), a Polish viewfinder camera 
 Ami (spider), a synonym of Neischnocolus
 Achievement motivation inventory, a psychological test 
 Acute myocardial infarction, a heart attack
 Adjusted mutual information, in information theory
 Advanced metering infrastructure, for energy smart metering
 Arcminute Microkelvin Imager, a pair of radio telescopes
 Amazon Machine Image, a special type of virtual appliance used to create a virtual machine
 American Megatrends International, a main provider of PC BIOS firmware

Transportation
 Citroën Ami, a 1960s family car
 Citroën Ami (electric), a 2020s electric vehicle

Other uses 
 Cyclone Ami, in Fiji 2002–03

See also
Ammi (disambiguation)